XHCUN-FM 105.9 is a radio station in Cancún, Quintana Roo, known as Radio Cultural Ayuntamiento. It is owned directly by the government of the municipality of Cancún and is the oldest station owned by a Mexican municipality. It was the only such station until XHOJF-FM, in Ocotlán de Morelos in Oaxaca, received its permit in 2011.

References

Radio stations in Quintana Roo
Public radio in Mexico
Cancún